The Westland Widgeon was a helicopter developed by Westland Aircraft as a private venture improvement on the Westland WS-51 Dragonfly.

Design and development
Westland Aircraft decided to make a private venture improvement on the Westland WS-51 Dragonfly helicopter, which was a licensed Sikorsky Aircraft design, by increasing the cabin capacity and replacing the Dragonfly's rotor head, blades and gearbox with the units used in the Westland Whirlwind. Three Dragonfly Series 1As were converted to WS-51 Series 2 Widgeon specifications and the first one flew on 23 August 1955. One of these conversions, registration G-ANLW, was the first helicopter to land at the London Heliport on 8 April 1959, and later appeared in the 1971 film, When Eight Bells Toll.

In 1957, there was a plan to take up to 24 existing Fleet Air Arm Dragonflies to Dragonfly HC.7 standard (as the Naval Widgeon was to become) but this was abandoned and it contributed to the decision to stop progress.

Operators

Brazilian Navy
 Ceylon
 Royal Ceylon Air Force

Royal Hong Kong Auxiliary Air Force

Royal Jordanian Air Force

Nigerian Air Force - operated a single requisitioned ex-Bristow Widgeon during the Biafran War.

Bristow Helicopters

Specifications (Widgeon)

See also
 List of rotorcraft

References

Notes

Bibliography

 Apostolo, Giorgio. The Illustrated Encyclopedia of Helicopters. New York: Bonanza Books, 1984. .
 
 James, Derek N. Westland Aircraft since 1915. London: Putnam Aeronautical Books, 1991. .
 "Widgeon and Whirlwind —with power by Alvis: A Report on two current Westland developments." Flight, 1955.
 "World Helicopter Market". Flight International, 13 July 1967. pp. 57–71.
 "World Helicopter Market". Flight International, 11 July 1968. pp. 48–60.

External links

 Westland Widgeon pages at helis.com database

1950s British helicopters
Widgeon (helicopter)
Single-engined piston helicopters